Sumant Moolgaokar (5 March 1906 – 1989)  was an Indian industrialist, known as architect of Tata Motors. He was the chief executive of Tata Engineering and Locomotive Company (TELCO). He also remained Vice-Chairman of Tata Steel

and served as non-executive chairman of Maruti Suzuki.

He was awarded the Padma Bhushan, third-highest civilian honour by the Government of India in 1990.  He started his career as an engineer in CP cement, now known as ACC kymore cement works. He established  Kymore engineering institute, now known as Sumant Moolgaokar Training Institute in 1957.  

In his memory Sumant Moolgaokar Stadium opened at Telco Colony, Jamshedpur.
The Tata Sumo vehicle, launched in 1994, was named after him.

References

1906 births
1989 deaths
Marathi people
Recipients of the Padma Bhushan in trade and industry
Businesspeople from Mumbai
Tata Motors people